Darjak, also rendered as Darjag, may refer to:
 Darjak, Bashagard
 Darjak, Minab